Abdullah Ahmad Badawi formed the first Abdullah cabinet after being invited by Tuanku Syed Sirajuddin to begin a new government following the resignation of the previous Prime Minister of Malaysia, Mahathir Mohamad. Prior to the election, Mahathir led (as Prime Minister) the sixth Mahathir cabinet, a coalition government that consisted of members of the component parties of Barisan Nasional. It was the 15th cabinet of Malaysia formed since independence.

This is a list of the members of the first cabinet of the fifth Prime Minister of Malaysia, Abdullah Ahmad Badawi.

Composition

Full members
The federal cabinet consisted of the following ministers:

Deputy ministers

See also
 Members of the Dewan Rakyat, 10th Malaysian Parliament
 List of parliamentary secretaries of Malaysia#First Abdullah cabinet

References

Cabinet of Malaysia
2003 establishments in Malaysia
2004 disestablishments in Malaysia
Cabinets established in 2003
Cabinets disestablished in 2004